Meni, Meny or Menankhpepy (also mentioned as Prince Mena in older sources) was an ancient Egyptian high official who lived during the reigns of Pepy I and Merenre Nemtyemsaf I, in the late Sixth Dynasty. Most of what is known about his life comes from his mastaba burial tomb in the Dendera Necropolis, a few hundred metres south of the Temple to Hathor. This tomb was explored during 1897 and 1898 by a team led by the British archaeologist Flinders Petrie.

Meni's full name was Men-ankh-Pepy, which can be translated as "Pepy's life is enduring" and makes reference to that king. However, in most inscriptions his name is rendered just as Meni, which was his nickname or good name.

Life 

While some authors suggested that Meni might have lived during the Ninth Dynasty (mainly on the basis of palaeography), and even the Eleventh Dynasty (based on architectural style), it seems now more probable that he lived during the late Sixth Dynasty, as his different titles appear to indicate. During his lifetime, Meni held a number of administrative titles, most of which can be associated with the pyramid estates of Sixth Dynasty kings Pepy I and Merenre. He managed the estate of both pyramid settlements, and held the office of royal seal-bearer. He is also described as a sole companion, meaning he had relatively direct access to the king, though this was a relatively low rank. Within the context of royal service, Meni is also recorded as overseer of tenant landholders of the Great House. In his local area, he was charged with supervising "all vegetation" and "every desert", as well as the "fishers, fowlers and hunters" of the nome (Dendera). 

As was common at that time, he also held religious offices: he was a lector priest, and captain of the bat- or khebat-boat, an obscure term unattested elsewhere. It most likely refers to the ritual barque of Hathor, akin to the Abydos boats. The term itself ( or ) may be a participle of either ḫbꜣ or bꜣ, two verbs meaning "to hack up". Thus, the name of this barque might have been "the hacked up (one)". Other people buried at Dendera had titles referring to the construction and towing of Hathor's barque, which indeed had a crew of oarsmen. Probably this is the same type of ritual barque that is recorded much later to have made a festival journey to Edfu.

A cornice inside his tomb, which was found badly damaged, includes a short biographical text in which Meni extols his good deeds, including some unusual phrases only attested in Dendera so far:

In the corridor of his mastaba, a damaged slab was found of a man with his wife. It depicts Nebet-tef, together with her title of lady-in-waiting. While the name of the man is lost, the scene probably depicted Meni's wife. Likely, this slab was part of an architrave that may have included offerings and an appeal to the living along with another representation of the couple (a reconstruction can be seen below). Another inscription, badly defaced, mentions the phrase "... with barley, wheat, cattle...", which tells about accumulation of property. This may refer to Meni's private estate or may concern the temple of Hathor in Dendera, mentioned in the following line.

A full list of Meni's titles is as follows: sole companion, seal-bearer of the king of Lower Egypt, overseer of tenant landholders of the Great House, ruler of the estate (the pyramid) of "The-perfection-of-Mery-Re-abides", ruler of the  estate (the pyramid) of "The-perfection-of-Merenre-appears", high official, estate manager, lector priest, director in the barque of Hathor, overseer of every cultivated place and every desert place, overseer of fishers, fowlers and hunters of the nome, overseer of all vegetation of the nome.

There is no evidence as to how many years Meni lived. One of his stelae (currently kept at the Egyptian Museum in Cairo) represents him as a portly and elderly person; in the same stela, he is wearing a long kilt, which is generally associated with portly old age in the Old Kingdom. Since such depictions are rare at Dendera, this may not be a meaningless stereotype, but an indication that he may have lived until a relative old age.

Possible links with individuals recorded in Giza 
Some authors have linked this Meni with another figure of the same name who built a contemporary mastaba (possibly two) in Giza (the necropolis of ancient Memphis). The mastaba(s), now lost (but possibly S2530/2531 in the Western Cemetery), contained an alabaster offering slab bearing the names of Meni and Menakhpepy. The titles of this person in the inscription are: "sole companion, lector priest, overseer of priests, overseer of the two granaries", the first two also found in the tomb of Meni in Dendera. However, there is no certainty that the two are indeed the same person as they could just belong to the same family. The second inscription in the slab is devoted to a woman, the royal acquaintance and priestess of Hathor N[iankh]hathor (the name is partially erased due to wear). The relation of the woman to Meni is unclear, although this type of offering slabs are typical of married couples.

In one of the Giza reliefs, this Meni appears with his wife (named Merutnes, and likely not the same person mentioned in Dendera or in the offering slab). The couple is shown receiving offerings from their children. Meni is also referred to as "elder of the house".  In a separate lintel, the couple are being towed in a riverboat, piloted by their eldest son, while Merutnes smells a lotus flower. The names of the children depicted are: the scribe Aahathor, Hetepnebu, Meretsit and Nefertjeshathor. A block for a false-door, that may come from the same mastaba(s), records the name of Meni and his mother, Neferi.

Therefore, it looks like Meni built a tomb at Giza and then another one at Dendera, both probably dating to the reign of Merenre Nemtyemsaf I. As a senior provincial official, and given that the offices of manager of the estate were almost certainly held at Memphis, it would make sense that Meni made provisions for his afterlife there. Thus, it is likely that Meni resided in the capital for several years.

Tomb of Meni in Dendera 

Meni was buried inside a large mastaba, quite elaborate in plan, including a corridor, several wells and an open air court. Its style is similar to the mastabas of Idu I, Idu II and Mereri, also in Dendera. First explored in the late 19th century, the tomb contained a decorated false door, stelae, door drums and an elaborate sarcophagus chamber, among other minor finds.

The false door shows four representations of the figure of Meni, as if approaching the door in the centre. The inscriptions give his name and titles. The lintel is likewise inscribed with the same titles after a short offering, which is almost identical to the one on the cornice. Below on the left there is a representation of Meni (clad in a leopard skin) sitting before the offering table, which is spread with palm-branches and surrounded by trays of offerings. The inscription here asks for thousands of bread, beer, oxen, oryx, gooses, ducks, widgeons, pigeons, cloths, all good vegetables and all good things for the high official Meni. This scene is unusual in that it also depicts a censer with an armlike handle, followed by the words "giving incense". There remained a fragmentary lintel above it, which now kept in London.

All five limestone stelae contain similar inscriptions, with offerings to Osiris and Anubis and listing Meni's titles. Only one of the stelae contains Meni's full name. They are big limestone slabs, with high raised relief and carefully detailed hieroglyphs that stand out about 6mm deep, characteristic features of the workshops of Dendera at this time. According to Petrie, "[a]ny one of them would be a prize in any Museum in Europe". Indeed, the Egypt Exploration Fund quickly scattered them throughout several museums; at least one stayed in Egypt. In most of the stelae, Meni is shown wearing a triangular, pleated kilt and a priest's leopard skin, which are rarely depicted at Dendera. He also wears bracelets, and a pectoral necklace of four strands. In all of them, Meni stands at the left, while the rest of the space is covered by the prayer. As an example, the stela held in the Bristol City Museum and Art Gallery reads:

The stela in the Museum of Fine Arts, Boston has a similar inscription, translated by Ronald J. Leprohon. The stela in the Egyptian Museum has a slightly different inscription, in which Meni expresses his desire to participate in several important festivals:

Twelve small false doors were carved in the walls of the mastaba, all of which had a roller, or drum over them. Two of those contained the inscription "the high official Meni" (ḥꜣtj-ꜥ mnj). Other inscribed remains included a cornice with a very fragmentary autobiographical inscription, as well as a possibly two fragments of a 4-piece architrave, the first from the left depicting Meni and his wife, and the third, which remained almost complete, containing an appeal to the living. Finally, an unrelated, mostly defaced slab also contained a fragmentary appeal to the living and possibly some biographical information.

Meni's sarcophagus or burial chamber was built of slabs. It was rough outside but finely painted inside. It contained Meni's name and titles, together with detailed lists and drawings of different offerings, which were largely vanished but were carefully copied by Petrie's team. The offerings included a tabulated list which contained everything that an Egyptian noble required for his daily personal needs: unguents, eye-paint, food, etc. Strikingly, Meni's decoration also includes a passage from the Pyramid texts, a borrowing that wasn't attested elsewhere. The text, distributed in ten columns, deals with ritual anointing (Utterances 72-78).

Tomb of Meni in Giza 
Inscriptions bearing the names of Meni and Menankhpepy were found in a mastaba in the Western Cemetery of Giza (known as Meni II). This may well be the same mastaba as the one known as Meni I, identified as S2530/2531, or they might have been intended as separate for a family burial complex. In Meni I eight fragments from a false door were found, inscribed with offering formulae, as well as an architrave fragment inscribed with the names of Meni and his children. Meni II contained two false-doors, two panels with reliefs and inscriptions, two inscribed lintels, the upper part of jambs, three drums, and a block from a false-door.

The reliefs do not only show Meni, but also his wife and children. One inscription also possibly mentions his mother. Among the common offering formulae, there is also a curse against tomb robbers. This curse invokes crocodiles and snakes, and reads:

Notes

References

Bibliography

See also 

 Dendera Temple complex
 Art of Ancient Egypt
 Nyibunesu
 Stele

23rd-century BC Egyptian people
People of the Sixth Dynasty of Egypt
Ancient Egyptian royal sealers
Ancient Egyptian priests